Hochwürden erbt das Paradies is a 1993 German comedy television film. It recounts the escapades of a rural Austrian priest and his parishioners.

Cast

External links
 

1993 films
1993 television films
1993 comedy films
German comedy films
German television films
1990s German-language films
Films shot in Austria
German-language television shows
1990s German films
RTL (German TV channel) original programming